Germán Gustavo Denis (born 10 September 1981) is an Argentine professional footballer who plays as a striker for Italian Serie D club Real Calepina.

Career
Denis began his career in 1997 playing for his local team Talleres de Remedios de Escalada in Primera B Metropolitana, the regionalised third division of Argentine football.

In 2000, he moved to Primera newcomers Club Atlético Los Andes, in Lomas de Zamora, but the club was relegated at the end of his first season. He continued playing for them in Primera B Nacional until he was signed by Italian Serie B side Cesena.

In 2003, Denis made his return to Argentina and the Primera Division with Jorge Burruchaga's Arsenal de Sarandí. He played for them for two seasons before moving on to Colón. In summer 2006, he rejoined former manager Jorge Burruchaga at Independiente.

After scoring 15 goals in the first 13 games of the Apertura 2007 tournament, Denis was called up to join the Argentina national team for the first two matches of the 2010 FIFA World Cup qualification, against Chile and Venezuela. He made his debut with a brief substitute appearance against Venezuela on 16 October 2007.

Napoli
In June 2008 Denis signed for Italian Serie A club Napoli for a fee about €7.5285 million.

In his first appearance for the club, he scored a hat-trick as Napoli ran out winners in a friendly against Austrian side Jennersdorf. Napoli beat Jennersdorf 10–0. Denis scored his first official goal for Napoli against Vllaznia in the UEFA Cup, on 14 August 2008. He also scored once more in the UEFA Cup against Benfica. On 29 October, Denis scored the first hat-trick of his career in Serie A during Napoli's 3–0 victory over Reggina. However, new manager Donadoni preferred the Zalayeta-Lavezzi striking partnership, reducing Denis's playing time.

Udinese
Denis moved to Udinese for the 2010–11 Serie A season. He played the second leg against Arsenal in 2011–12 UEFA Champions League play-off round.

Atalanta
Upon achieving promotion from Serie B, Atalanta B.C. signed Denis on a season-long loan for the 2011–12 season. Denis scored 12 goals in 16 matches between the start of the season and the winter break. He then scored a hat-trick in a 4–1 victory against Roma on 26 February 2012, bringing his goal tally up to 15 for the season. Denis ended the season as the club's top scorer with 16 goals.

In November 2011, Atalanta director Pierpaolo Marino confirmed that Denis would join the club on a permanent deal after the end of the player's loan contract. On 19 June, the deal was finalized and Denis signed a three-year contract with the club for an undisclosed fee.

On 27 April 2015, Denis was banned for five matches after he burst into the opposition dressing room the day before and punched Empoli defender Lorenzo Tonelli.

On 30 January 2016, Denis scored on his final appearance for Atalanta, a 1–1 draw against Sassuolo, before returning to play for Independiente in Argentina. He is the joint-highest non-Italian goalscorer in the club's history in Serie A, alongside Duván Zapata, with 56 goals.

Later years: Reggina and Italian Serie D
Denis signed a two-year contract with Serie C club Reggina on 22 August 2019, making a return to Italy after three years. He was part of the squad that won promotion to Serie B, and played in the Italian second division with the Calabrians as well, before leaving Reggina by the end of the 2021–22 season.

On 11 September 2022, Denis was unveiled as a new signing of Serie D amateurs Real Calepina.

Style of play
A powerful striker, who is capable of playing anywhere along the front-line, and of using his physique to hold up the ball for teammates, Denis is known for his goalscoring, as well as ability in the air. During his time in Argentina, he was given the nickname el tanque, which means the tank in Spanish, due to his physical strength. He is also an accurate penalty taker.

Career statistics

Honours
Individual
 Primera División top scorer: 2007 Apertura

References

External links
Player profile on Atalanta's official website

Living people
1981 births
Sportspeople from Lanús
Association football forwards
Argentine footballers
Argentina international footballers
Argentine expatriate footballers
Argentine Primera División players
Primera Nacional players
Serie A players
Serie B players
Serie C players
Peruvian Primera División players
Talleres de Remedios de Escalada footballers
A.C. Cesena players
S.S.C. Napoli players
Udinese Calcio players
Atalanta B.C. players
Quilmes Atlético Club footballers
Club Atlético Los Andes footballers
Arsenal de Sarandí footballers
Club Atlético Colón footballers
Club Atlético Independiente footballers
Club Atlético Lanús footballers
Club Universitario de Deportes footballers
Reggina 1914 players
Expatriate footballers in Italy
Argentine expatriate sportspeople in Italy
Expatriate footballers in Peru